Established in 1948, University of Queensland Press (UQP) is an Australian publishing house.

Founded as a traditional university press, UQP has since branched into publishing books for general readers in the areas of fiction, non-fiction, poetry, Indigenous writing and youth literature.

From 2010, UQP has been releasing selected out-of-print titles in digital formats, in addition to the digital and print publishing of new books.

In 2021, UQP was awarded Small Publisher of the Year by the Australian Book Industry Awards (ABIAs).

History
UQP began as a publisher of scholarly works in 1948, and made its transition into trade publishing in the mid-1960s through its Paperback Poets series. The Paperback Poets series came into being when Australian novelist and poet David Malouf approached publisher Frank Thompson and suggested that poetry ought to be made available widely and inexpensively. Thompson agreed, and UQP's poetry list began with Malouf's first book, Bicycle and Other Poems, alongside volumes by Michael Dransfield and Rodney Hall. Since then, UQP has become Australia's leading poetry publisher, maintaining a poetry list that includes John Tranter, David Malouf, Thomas Shapcott, and many others.  It has launched the careers  of many Australian writers, such as David Malouf, Peter Carey (novelist), Kate Grenville, Doris Pilkington, Melissa Lucashenko and Nick Earls. In 1978 the press published its first title in its UQP Studies in Australian Literature series.

In 1972, during a time of "Australia’s developing awareness of her place in Asia", UQP launched the Asian and Pacific Writing Series, edited by Michael Wilding and later Harry Aveling. In 1980 the press launched the Leaders of Asia Series, with K. G. Tregonning as the general editor.

API Network

Founded in 1997, Australian Public Intellectual Network (API Network) is an organisation focused on linking Australian public intellectuals, and a registered publisher as Network Books. API Network was a scholarly imprint through the University of Queensland Press until 2004. Over this period it gradually transferred to Perth, Western Australia, where its imprint Network Books was formed as a not-for-profit publisher of scholarly titles on Australia. Creative Arts Review was edited by Ffion Murphy and included as a supplement to the Journal of Australian Studies between 1998 and 2008. It was produced at the Australia Research Institute, Curtin University of Technology, and published by UQ Press and the API Network. Journal of Nutritional Studies was also produced in this way. In 2002 API Network was also associated with Fremantle Centre Press.

As of 2006 it published the refereed journals Journal of Australian Studies, Australian Cultural History, and Life Writing (from 2005), as well as four book series: Australian Scholarly Classics, Symposia, Australian Essay, and Fresh Cuts. It also published the API Review of Books (JAS (Journal of Australian Studies) Review of Books from 2001-2005), Altitude 21C electronically.  the API Network continues to publish ACH: International Journal of Culture and History in Australia, which has been published electronically since 2003.

UQP today
UQP currently publishes books for general readers in the areas of fiction, poetry, non-fiction, Indigenous writing and youth literature. Many of UQP's recent fiction and poetry titles have won significant international acclaim, including Peter Carey's True History of the Kelly Gang, which won the 2001 Man Booker Prize and the Commonwealth Writers Prize. In 2019, Melissa Lucashenko won the Miles Franklin Award for her novel Too Much Lip.

In 2010, UQP announced that it will release selected out-of-print titles in digital formats, in addition to the digital and print publishing of new books.

In 2021, UQP was awarded Small Publisher of the Year by the Australian Book Industry Awards (ABIAs). Judges commented: 'UQP has been recognised with 13 award wins and 30 shortlistings in 2020. In the wake of COVID-19, it launched several initiatives: the UQP Quentin Bryce Award, the UQP Writing Mentorship, and Extraordinary Voices for Extraordinary Times podcast. It supported and actively promoted local bookshops and partnered with the Queensland Department of Education – to beam animated readings of UQP picture books into homes and classrooms. To improve diversity and career pathways for the literary sector – UQP launched its Indigenous Placement Program which has since been recognised as an industry-leading initiative – and hosted six internships for people from diverse and minority backgrounds, including an intern from Vision Australia.' 

The UQP Bookshop on the St Lucia campus of the University of Queensland opened in September 2021. Located in the Biological Sciences Library, it exclusively stocks UQP titles including new releases, children's books, poetry titles, and classics.

Books and authors
The UQP publication list includes novels, short stories, memoirs, essays, and poetry by writers such as Les Murray, Peter Carey, David Malouf, Katharine Susannah Prichard, Kenneth Slessor, Thea Astley, Janette Turner Hospital, Kate Grenville, Beverley Farmer, Lily Brett, Frank Brennan, Ian Lowe, Bernhard Schlink, Olga Masters, Randolph Stow, Michael Dransfield, Bruce Beaver, Jennifer Mills, Gwen Harwood, Melissa Lucashenko, Tony Birch and Elizabeth Jolley.

See also

List of university presses

References

External links
University of Queensland Press website

Book publishing companies of Australia
Companies based in Brisbane
Small press publishing companies
Publishing companies established in 1948
University presses of Australia